Hofmann is a German surname. Notable people with the surname include:

 Albert Hofmann (1906–2008), Swiss chemist, "father" of LSD
 Andreas Hofmann (athlete) (born 1991), German athlete
 Andreas Joseph Hofmann (1752–1849), German philosopher and revolutionary
 Armin Hofmann (1920–2020), Swiss designer
 August Wilhelm von Hofmann (1818–1892), German chemist
 Beate Hofmann (born 1963), German Lutheran bishop
 Charles Hofmann (1763–1823), Dutch musician and composer
 Eduard von Hofmann (1837–1897), Austrian physician and forensic pathologist
 Elise Hofmann (1889–1955), Austrian paleobotanist
 Ernst Hofmann (1880–1945), German film actor
 Fred Hofmann (1894–1964), American baseball player and coach
 Fritz Hofmann (chemist) (1866–1956), German chemist
 Fritz Hofmann (athlete) (1871–1927), German athlete
 Gert Hofmann (1931–1993), German writer
 Gunther O. Hofmann (born 1957), a German surgeon, physicist and university teacher
 Hans Hofmann (1880–1966), German-born American painter
 Hans J. Hofmann (1936–2010), German-born Canadian paleontologist
 Harald Hofmann (born 1973), Austrian rower
 Heinrich Hofmann (painter) (1824–1911), German painter
 Heinrich Hofmann (composer) (1842–1902), German composer and pianist
 Henner Hofmann (born 1950), director of photography
 Hofmann von Hofmannsthal
 Augustin Emil Hofmann von Hofmannsthal (1815–1881), Austrian industrialist
 Hugo Hofmann von Hofmannsthal (1874–1929), Austrian novelist, librettist, poet, dramatist, narrator, and essayist
 Isaak Löw Hofmann, Edler von Hofmannsthal (1759–1849), Austrian merchant
 Horst Hofmann (1919–1978), German U-boat officer
  (1635–1706), a Swiss theologian, historian and compiler of the Lexicon Universale
 John Beck Hofmann (born 1969), Hollywood screenwriter and director
 Josef Hofmann (1876–1957), Polish-American pianist, composer and inventor
 Joseph Ehrenfried Hofmann (1900–1973), German historian of mathematics
 Karl Andreas Hofmann (1870–1940), German inorganic chemist
 Karl-Wilhelm Hofmann (1921–1945), German Luftwaffe ace
 Klaus Hofmann (born 1939), German musicologist
 Klaus H. Hofmann (1911–1995), Swiss/American biochemist
 Leopold Hofmann (1738–1793), Austrian classical composer
 Leopold Hofmann (footballer) (1905–1976), Austrian footballer
 Ludwig Hofmann (footballer) (1900–1935), German footballer
 Ludwig von Hofmann (1861–1945), German painter
 Mark Hofmann (born 1954), U.S. murderer and forger, antagonistic former LDS
 Markus Hofmann (born 1975), German memory trainer, keynote speaker and author
 Max Hofmann (born 1974), a German journalist and moderator
 Maximilian Hofmann (born 1993), Austrian footballer
 Michael Hofmann (born 1957), German poet and translator
 Michel-Rostislav Hofmann (1915–1975), Franco-Russian translator, writer and musicologist
 Murad Wilfried Hofmann (1931–2020), Muslim German diplomat and author
 Nico Hofmann (born 1959), German film director and film producer
 Olivia Hofmann (born 1992), Austrian sport shooter
 Ottmar Hofmann (1835–1900), German entomologist
 Otto Hofmann (1896–1982), Nazi official
 Pavel Hofmann (born 1938), Czech rower
 Peter Hofmann (1944–2010), German tenor
 Richard Hofmann (composer) (1844–1918), German composer
 Richie Hofmann (born 1987), American poet
 Rudolf Hofmann (1895–1970), German General of World War II
 Steffen Hofmann (born 1980), German footballer
 Thomas Hofmann (born 1968), German food chemist and academic administrator
 Vlastimil Hofmann (1881–1970), birth name of Polish artist Wlastimil Hofman
 William Hofmann (1924–1995), illustrator

German-language surnames
Surnames of German origin